42nd meridian may refer to:

42nd meridian east, a line of longitude east of the Greenwich Meridian
42nd meridian west, a line of longitude west of the Greenwich Meridian